National Highway 717A, commonly referred to as NH 717A is a National Highway in  India which is a part of the Bharatmala Pariyojana of Ministry of Road Transport and Highways, Government of India. NH 717-A starts from National Highway 17 at Bagrakote and ends in Gangtok. NH-717A traverses the states of West Bengal and Sikkim in India. The highway is being constructed and maintained by the National Highways and Infrastructure Development Corporation Limited (NHIDCL).

Route 

 West Bengal

Bagrakote - Labha - Algarah - Pedong - West Bengal Sikkim Reshi Border.

 Sikkim

West Bengal Sikkim Reshi Border - Rhenock - Rorathang - Pakyong Airport - Pakyong Bazaar - Ranipool -  Gangtok.

Junctions  

  Terminal near Bagrakote.
  Terminal near Rhenock.
  Terminal near Gangtok.

See also 

 List of National Highways in India
 List of National Highways in India by state

References

External links 

 NH 717A on OpenStreetMap

National highways in India
National Highways in Sikkim
National Highways in West Bengal
Transport in Gangtok